Acid Queen is the second solo studio album by Tina Turner. It was released in 1975 on the EMI label in the UK and on United Artists in the US. Although it is a Tina Turner solo album, the first single, "Baby, Get It On," was a duet with Ike Turner, her musical partner and husband at the time. Acid Queen was her last solo album before their separation and her departure from Ike & Tina Turner Revue.

Background and songs
The Acid Queen album was inspired by Tina Turner's role as The Acid Queen in Ken Russell's film version of The Who's classic rock opera Tommy, which also featured Elton John, Eric Clapton, Jack Nicholson, Ann-Margret, and starred Roger Daltrey.

Side A of the album consists of rock covers. In addition to a re-recorded version of the title track, it also contained the Rolling Stones' "Under My Thumb" and "Let's Spend the Night Together," The Who's "I Can See For Miles" and Led Zeppelin's "Whole Lotta Love." Turner recorded two different versions of "Acid Queen," one for the Tommy soundtrack produced by The Who and the other for her album produced by Danny Diante and Spencer Proffer.

Side B was written and produced mainly by Ike Turner. It includes Ike & Tina Turner's last single together, the disco-influenced "Baby, Get It On" (No. 88 Pop, No. 31 R&B). Other singles include "Whole Lotta Love" (No. 61 R&B) released in 1975, and "Acid Queen" released in the UK in 1976. The track "Under My Thumb" was released as a single in Australia to promote Turner's tour, reaching No. 80 in 1977.

Release and reissues 
Acid Queen was released in August 1975, peaking at No. 155 on the Billboard 200 and No. 39 on the R&B albums chart. It has since been re-issued on both vinyl and CD with a series of different cover pictures by both EMI Music and its Dutch midprice subsidiary Disky Communications. The first release of the album on CD included three "bonus" tracks taken from the 1969 Ike & Tina Turner albums The Hunter and Outta Season.

Critical reception 
Billboard gave the album a positive review, noting the "strong production from Denny Diante, Spencer Proffer (and Ike on side two)....Ms. Turner's gruff vocals are perfect for the raucous British material she has chosen, while side two, though soul oriented, should also reach the pop fans with its strong Sid Sharp string arrangements." By contrast, Dave Mash of Rolling Stone criticized the album. He stated, "The primary flaw in the rock-classics side of Acid Queen rests not with the singer but with her producers, Denny Diante and Spencer Proffer. The arrangements here are the opposite of what seems sensible," adding that the "material also seems ill-chosen."

Reviewing Acid Queen in Christgau's Record Guide: Rock Albums of the Seventies (1981), Robert Christgau said: "Her rock myth reconfirmed cinematically, Tina quickly turns out two from the Who (only fair), two from the Stones (who else?), and one from Led Zep ('Whole Lotta Love,' brilliant, I trust R. Plant has his big twelve-inch in a sling at this very moment). With bass lines lifted whole from the originals the singing almost doesn't matter. And what rocks most mythically? I. Turner's cleverly entitled 'Baby—Get It On.'"

Reviewing the album for AllMusic, Rob Theakston wrote: "Acid Queen is thus an immensely enjoyable affair from start to finish. Her version of Led Zep's 'Whole Lotta Love' takes the dynamics of the original and turns them upside down to deliver an affair that is on par with some of Isaac Hayes' finest moments.

Track listing

Personnel
 Tina Turner – lead vocals
 Ike Turner – vocals on "Baby Get It On", producer (Side B), arranger
 Ed Greene – drums
 Henry Davis – bass guitar
 Ray Parker Jr. – guitar
 Spencer Proffer – guitar, producer (tracks: A1-A5, B1-B4), arranger
 Jerry Peters, Clarence McDonald – keyboards
 Jeffrey Marmelzat – keyboards, arranger
 Joe Clayton – congas
 Alan Lindgren – ARP, synthesizer, string ensemble
 Jimmie Haskell – ARP, synthesizer, orchestration, producer (tracks: B2-B4), string and horn arrangements
 The Sid Sharp Strings – strings
 Tom Scott – saxophone, flute
 Plas Johnson, Bill Perkins – saxophone
 Lew McCreary – trombone
 Tony Terran, Charles Findley – trumpet
 Julia Tillman Waters, Kim Carnes, Maxine Willard Waters - backing vocals
 Denny Diante – producer (tracks: A1-A5, B1-B4), arranger, percussion
 Ron Malo – recording, mixing

Chart performance

References

Tina Turner albums
1975 albums
Albums produced by Ike Turner
Albums arranged by Jimmie Haskell
United Artists Records albums
Albums recorded at Bolic Sound